In the theory of integrable systems, a compacton, introduced in , is a soliton with compact support.

An example of an equation with compacton solutions is the generalization

of the Korteweg–de Vries equation (KdV equation) with m, n > 1. The case with m = n is the Rosenau–Hyman equation as used in their 1993 study; the case m = 2, n = 1 is essentially the KdV equation.

Example
The equation

has a travelling wave solution given by

This has compact support in x, and so is a compacton.

See also
Peakon
Vector soliton

References

Solitons